Miller—Mackey House is a historic home located at Lancaster in Erie County, New York.  It  is a locally distinctive example of the Colonial Revival style of architecture built in 1905 for Dr. John G. Miller.  In 1957, the Depew Lancaster Boys' Club purchased the property and since that time has been used as a recreational and social facility for the area's young people.

It was listed on the National Register of Historic Places in 1999.  It is located in the Broadway Historic District.

References

External links
Miller--Mackey House - U.S. National Register of Historic Places on Waymarking.com

Houses on the National Register of Historic Places in New York (state)
Colonial Revival architecture in New York (state)
Houses completed in 1905
Houses in Erie County, New York
National Register of Historic Places in Erie County, New York
1905 establishments in New York (state)
Historic district contributing properties in Erie County, New York